Eric Soviguidi (born 21 March 1971) is a Beninese prelate of the Catholic Church who works in the diplomatic service of the Holy See.

Biography
Eric Soviguidi was born on 21 March 1971 in Abomey, Benin. He was ordained a priest for the Archdiocese of Cotonou on 10 October 1998.

He entered the diplomatic service of the Holy See on 1 July 2005, and has served at the apostolic nunciatures in Haiti, Ghana, Tanzania, Guatemala, and at the Section for Relations with States of the Secretariat of State.

On 30 November 2021, Pope Francis appointed him Permanent Observer of the Holy See to UNESCO.

See also
 List of heads of the diplomatic missions of the Holy See

References

Living people
1971 births
Diplomats of the Holy See